Inseparable Bros is a 2019 South Korean comedy-drama film directed by Yook Sang-hyo, starring Shin Ha-kyun, Lee Kwang-soo and Esom.

Plot
Kang Se-ha (Shin Ha-kyun) and Park Dong-gu (Lee Kwang-soo) are not blood-related brothers, but they have been like brothers for the past 20 years. Se-ha is smart, but he has a physical disability. Dong-gu is not very smart, but he is in excellent physical condition. Mi-hyun (Esom) is the only person who treats them without prejudice, and she helps them get out into the world. One day, Dong-gu's mother suddenly visits him and acts as his guardian.

Cast

Main
 Shin Ha-kyun as Kang Se-ha 
 Lee Kwang-soo as Park Dong-gu
 Esom as Nam Mi-hyun

Supporting
 Park Chul-min as Song Seok-du, a Social Welfare's worker.
 Kwon Hae-hyo as Park Joo-min, a priest.
 Gil Hae-yeon as Jang Jung-soon, Dong-gu's mother. 
 Kim Kyung-nam as Yook Kyung-nam

Production 
Principal photography began on May 23, 2018, and wrapped on August 17, 2018.

Release 
The film premiered in South Korean cinemas on May 1, 2019, and ranked second in the local box office behind Avengers: Endgame.

Awards and nominations

References

External links

2019 films
2019 comedy-drama films
South Korean comedy-drama films
Next Entertainment World films
2010s South Korean films